The South Africa national roller hockey team is the national team side of South Africa at international roller hockey. Usually is part of FIRS Roller Hockey World Cup. The team is based mostly in the Portuguese community radicated in South Africa.

South Africa squad - 2010 Rink Hockey American Championship

Team Staff
 General Manager:
 Mechanic:

Coaching Staff
 Head Coach: Jorge Manuel Esteves
 Assistant:

Titles

References

External links
Website of South Africa Roller Federation Federation

National Roller Hockey Team
Roller hockey
National roller hockey (quad) teams